Captain Arthur Claydon  (25 September 1885 – 8 July 1918) was a British World War I flying ace credited with seven aerial victories.

Biography
Claydon was one of five brothers, born in Deeping St. James, Lincolnshire. In 1902 he and his older brother Ebenezer emigrated to Canada, and after settling in Winnipeg founded their own general contracting business in 1904.

Having been a member of the militia unit The Winnipeg Grenadiers since 1903, he was commissioned as a lieutenant when he enlisted into the Canadian Expeditionary Force on 18 February 1916, and was assigned to the 38th Battery, 10th Brigade, Canadian Field Artillery. After arriving in England he transferred to the Royal Flying Corps on 30 October 1916, to train as a pilot at Reading.

On 29 April 1917 he was seconded to the RFC with the rank of temporary lieutenant, and was appointed a flying officer the same day. He was posted to No. 32 Squadron on 6 September. On 11 November 1917 he was shot down by German ace Max Ritter von Müller, but survived, gaining his first victory shortly afterwards, on 20 November, flying a DH.5.

On 6 May 1918 he was promoted to acting-captain. Between 8 May and 25 June 1918, he gained six more victories (including one shared) flying the S.E.5a.

Claydon was killed on 8 July 1918, after being shot down by Paul Billik of Jagdstaffel 52 near Carvin. He is buried at the Cabaret Rouge British Cemetery at Souchez.

On 2 August 1918 his award of the Distinguished Flying Cross was gazetted. The citation read:
Lieutenant (Temporary Captain) Arthur Claydon (formerly Canadian Field Artillery).
Recently this officer, single-handed, went to the assistance of another pilot, who was attacked by eleven Fokker biplanes and six scouts. By his gallant conduct and skilful manoeuvring he not only extricated the pilot, but drove down several of the enemy aeroplanes. He has shown great initiative and gallantry in locating, bombing and attacking troops on the ground from low altitudes.

References

1885 births
1918 deaths
People from the Deepings
Canadian Expeditionary Force officers
Royal Flying Corps officers
British World War I flying aces
Royal Air Force personnel of World War I
British military personnel killed in World War I
Aviators killed by being shot down
Recipients of the Distinguished Flying Cross (United Kingdom)
Royal Regiment of Canadian Artillery personnel